Electrovaya Inc. is a developer and manufacturer of portable Lithium-ion batteries and battery management systems for the automotive, warehousing, autonomous guided vehicles, power grid, medical, and mobile device sectors. The company is based in Mississauga, Ontario, Canada.

Overview 

The company was founded by Dr. Sankar Das Gupta and  Dr. Jim Jacobs in 1996 after beginning their research into battery technologies in 1983.  The company went public in 2000, and is listed on the Toronto Stock Exchange under the symbol EFL.

Electrovaya owns over 100 patents (issued and pending) pertaining to electrode and electrolyte materials, battery architectures, battery system designs, battery management systems, and battery manufacturing methods.

In addition to developing batteries for electric vehicle and grid storage applications, Electrovaya were among the first developers of mobile battery chargers for electronic devices, releasing the Powerpad in 2001. This technology was the predecessor to the battery used in the Scribbler tablet computer series.  Electrovaya technology has also been used by NASA in their EMU system.

Electric vehicles 

In 2003, Electrovaya released the Maya-100, a prototype Zero-emissions vehicle powered by  lithium-ion batteries. The Maya-100 debuted at the 20th International Electric Vehicle Symposium at Long Beach, CA, and won the Technology Innovation Award at the Tour de Sol in 2004. In January 2008, Electrovaya launched the prototype Maya-300, a low-speed electric car for city driving.

Tata Indica EV 
Electrovaya has partnered with Tata Motors and Miljø Grenland/Innovasjon to manufacture batteries and electric cars using Electrovaya’s Lithium Ion SuperPolymer battery technology.

Car-sharing 
The first all-electric car-sharing program in the U.S. debuted at Baltimore's Inner Harbor with Electrovaya  offering its Maya-300 for rent at the Maryland Science Center.

Daimler 
Electrovaya purchased Daimler's 700 MWh/year battery factory in Europe in 2015  to produce batteries for Daimler's Smart electric drive car from 2015-2018.

Electric Lift-Trucks
In 2017, Electrovaya released heavy-duty Li-ion batteries designed for near continuous use in electric lift-trucks. In 2019 and 2020, the Raymond Corporation (a 100% subsidiary of Toyota) announced strategic agreements to use Electrovaya batteries as part of their electric forklift and battery product line.

Autonomous Guided Vehicles
Electrovaya developed and produced batteries suitable for smart-charging Autonomous guided vehicles, and partnered with Jabil to release an autonomous robot at ProMat 2019.

Energy Storage Systems 

In 2013, Electrovaya delivered 25 stationary battery energy storage systems to Scottish and Southern Electricity Networks ranging from 12-80 kWh for integrating renewable energy into power grids.

In 2015, Electrovaya installed a 450 kWh energy storage system for Glencore's microgrid at a remote mine in Northern Canada, allowing the use of alternate energy sources and reducing the use of diesel generators.

In 2016, Electrovaya completed a pilot project with Toronto Hydro to develop a containerized 600 kWh battery to balance grid loads.

Electrovaya also developed a transportable energy storage system for ConEdison capable of storing 800 kWh of energy to use during grid blackouts.

See also 
 Miljø Grenland
 Tata Indica
 Smart electric drive

References 

Companies listed on the Toronto Stock Exchange
Battery manufacturers
Electric vehicle battery manufacturers